Simona Halep defeated Veronika Kudermetova in the final, 6–2, 6–3 to win the women's singles tennis title at the 2022 Melbourne Summer Set 1. It was Halep's 23rd WTA Tour-level singles title, and her first in Australia.

This was the first edition of the tournament.

Seeds

Draw

Finals

Top half

Bottom half

Qualifying

Seeds

Qualifiers

Lucky loser

Qualifying draw

First qualifier

Second qualifier

Third qualifier

Fourth qualifier

Fifth qualifier

Sixth qualifier

See also 
 2022 Melbourne Summer Set 2 – Singles

References

External links 
Main draw
Qualifying draw

Melbourne Summer Set 1 - Singles
Women in Melbourne